Early parliamentary elections were held in Egypt on 6 April 1987, with a second round for nine seats on 13 April. They followed a change in the electoral law, approved by a referendum in February, which would allow independent candidates to run in the election. The result was a victory for the ruling National Democratic Party, which won 346 of the 458 seats. Following the election, the People's Assembly nominated incumbent Hosni Mubarak for the post of president, whose candidacy was put to voters in a referendum on 5 October.

Voter turnout was reported to be 50.45%, but was estimated to be closer to 25%.

Results

References

Elections in Egypt
1987 in Egypt
Egypt
April 1987 events in Africa